José Miguel de Velasco assumed offices as the 4th President of Bolivia on 12 August 1828. Due to the tumultuous events of the time, the original cabinet formed by Velasco on 12 August 1828 continued to function until 24 May 1829, spanning the entire six day presidency of Pedro Blanco Soto and the two nonconsecutive terms of Velasco which preceded and succeeded him.

Velasco formed one cabinet during his presidency, constituting the 4th national cabinet of Bolivia.

Cabinet Ministers

Composition 
President Antonio José de Sucre had formed two cabinets composed of three ministries during his presidency. On 18 April 1828, a military mutiny in Chuquisaca left Sucre wounded and incapable of performing presidential duties. In his capacity as President of the Council of Ministers, Minister of War José María Pérez de Urdininea assumed the presidency on an interim basis until Sucre presented his official resignation on 2 August.

On 12 August 1828, the Constituent Congress elected Andrés de Santa Cruz president with José Miguel de Velasco as vice president. Santa Cruz, who at the time was in Santiago serving as the ambassador of Peru to Chile, would never assume office and Velasco served as interim president until 18 December. During this time, the main composition of Sucre's cabinet remained intact with Pérez de Urdininea as Minister of War and Miguel María de Aguirre as Minister of Finance. The removal of Infante Facundo as Minister of the Interior in favor of Mariano del Callejo on 12 August was the only change made.

As it became clear that Santa Cruz would not arrive to assume the presidency, the Congress reconvened on 18 December and elected Pedro Blanco Soto and José Ramón de Loayza president and vice president. Loayza served as acting president until the arrival of Blanco Soto on 26 December. However, Blanco Soto never had the opportunity to form a cabinet of his own as he was arrested and assassinated on 1 January 1829 after just six days in office. Following the death of Blanco Soto, the Congress once again reconvened and renominated its original choice of Santa Cruz and Velasco for president and vice president on 31 January 1829. The following day, Velasco, again as acting president in the absence of Santa Cruz, formed a cabinet, removing Sucre's original ministers as well as Olañeta in favor of three new ministers.

The fact that all members of Velasco's cabinet remained in office through Blanco Soto's presidency means that his cabinet is counted as a single body from 12 August 1828 to 24 May 1829 rather than two separate ones despite Velaco's nonconsecutive terms.

Notes

References

Bibliography 
 

Cabinets of Bolivia
Cabinets established in 1828
Cabinets disestablished in 1829
1828 establishments in Bolivia